Kate Gordon may refer to:

 Kate Gordon (energy analyst), American lawyer and urban planner
 Kate Gordon (writer), Australian writer
 Kate M. Gordon (1861–1932), American suffragist
 Kate Gordon Moore (1878–1963), American psychologist
 Kate Gordon, character in Falling Skies

See also 
 Catherine Gordon (disambiguation)